A contra mundum injunction is a type of injunction in the law of England and Wales that is enforceable against anyone who knows about it, rather than a named party.

References

Injunctions in English law